Skonto may refer to
BK Skonto, a former basketball club based in Riga, Latvia
 Skonto FC, a Latvian football club based in Riga
FC Skonto/Cerība-46.vsk., a Latvian women's football club based in Riga
Skonto Hall in Riga, Latvia 
Skonto Stadium in Riga next to Skonto Hall